This is a list of VTV dramas released in 2021.

←2020 - 2021 - 2022→

VTV Special Tet dramas
This drama airs in prime time from 1st to 4th lunar-new-year days on VTV1.

Episodes 1 & 2 air from 22:00 to 22:50 and 21:10 to 22:00, respectively. Episodes 3 & 4 air from 21:40 to 22:30.

VTV1 Weeknight Prime-time dramas
These dramas air from 21:00 to 21:30, Monday to Friday on VTV1.

Note: From 28 Oct to 5 Nov, the time slot was followed by 2017 Tet drama Mátxcơva - Mùa thay lá re-release version (adjusted from 4 original episodes to 7 episodes).

VTV3 Weeknight Prime-time dramas

First line-up
These dramas air from 20:00 to 20:30, Monday to Friday on VTV3.

After the end of Xin chào hạnh phúc (season 4) on 30 Jul, the production for this time slot was disrupted due to COVID-19 quarantine. It was filled in by several shows before the rerun. The shows are respectively: Bố ơi! Mình đi đâu thế? (season 1, rebroadcast), Ngày xưa CHILL phết (from VTV6) and Trạng nguyên nhí (rebroadcast).

Second line-up

Monday-Wednesday dramas
These dramas air from 21:40 to 22:30, Monday to Wednesday on VTV3.

Thursday-Friday dramas
These dramas air from 21:40 to 22:30, Thursday and Friday on VTV3.

VTV3 Weekend Afternoon dramas
These dramas air from 14:00 to 14:50, Saturday and Sunday on VTV3.

<small>Note: Due to COVID-19 quarantine in Ho Chi Minh City since 31 May, the production for this time slot, which MegaGS takes charge, was disrupted and later stopped.

See also
 List of dramas broadcast by Vietnam Television (VTV)
 List of dramas broadcast by Hanoi Radio Television (HanoiTV)
 List of dramas broadcast by Vietnam Digital Television (VTC)
 List of television programmes broadcast by Vietnam Television (VTV)

References

External links
VTV.gov.vn – Official VTV Website 
VTV.vn – Official VTV Online Newspaper 

Vietnam Television original programming
2021 in Vietnamese television